Following is a list of past and present justices of the South Dakota Supreme Court, including justices of the Dakota Territorial Supreme Court.

Current justices 
The current justices of the South Dakota Supreme Court are as follow:

Past justices

Dakota Territorial Supreme Court

South Dakota Supreme Court 
 Dighton Corson, 1889–1913
 Alphonso G. Kellam, 1889–1896
 John E. Bennett, 1889–1893 (died in office)
 Howard G. Fuller, 1894–1908
 Charles S. Whiting, 1908–1922 (died in office)
 James H. McCoy, 1909–1921
 Ellison G. Smith, 1909–1923
 Samuel C. Polley, 1913–1947
 John Howard Gates, 1913–1927
 Frank Anderson, 1921–1925
 Carl G. Sherwood, 1922–1931
 Charles Hall Dillon, 1923–1927
 Dwight Campbell, 1925–1937
 Newton D. Burch, 1926–1931
 James Brown, 1927
 Frederick A. Warren, 1931–1944
 Herbert B. Rudolph, 1931–1957
 St. Clair Smith, 1937–1962
 Charles R. Hayes, 1947–1951
 Boyd Leedom, 1951–1955
 Charles S. Hanson, 1956–1973
 Alex Rentto, 1955–1971
 Chief justice  Frank Biegelmeier, 1959–1974
 Fred J. Homeyer, 1962–1971
 Chief justice Roger L. Wollman, 1971
 James M. Doyle, 1971–1976 (died in office)
 Fred R. Winans, 1971–1976
 Chief justice Francis G. Dunn, 1973–1985
 Oren P. Coler, 1974–1977
 Robert E. Morgan,  1976–1991
 Laurence J. Zastrow, 1976–1978
 Donald James Porter, 1977–1979
 Chief justice Jon Fosheim, 1978–1986
 Frank Henderson, 1979–1994
 Chief justice George W. Wuest, 1984–1995
 Richard W. Sabers, 1986–2008
 Chief justice Robert A. Miller, 1986–2001
 John K. Konenkamp, 1994–20??
 Steven L. Zinter, 2002–2018
 Judith Meierhenry, 2002–2011
 David Gilbertson, 1995–2021, Chief 2001–2021

References

South Dakota state court judges
Justices
South Dakots